Iosif Benzionovich Khriplovich (born 1937) is a Russian theoretical physicist who has made deep contributions in quantum field theory, atomic physics, and general relativity.

He is a Chief Researcher at the Budker Institute of Nuclear Physics, Novosibirsk, and holds a Chair of Theoretical Physics at Novosibirsk State University. Dr. Khriplovich was elected to the Russian Academy of Sciences in 2000, and remains a Corresponding Member. He was awarded the 2004 "Silver Dirac Medal for the Advancement of Theoretical Physics" by University of New South Wales, Sydney, Australia, and shared the 2005 Pomeranchuk Prize with Arkady Vainshtein For outstanding contribution to the understanding the properties of the standard model, especially for illuminating work on weak and strong interactions of quarks, a prize awarded by the Institute of Theoretical and Experimental Physics of Moscow.

Khriplovich was the first to correctly calculate the beta-function for the coupling renormalization in a non-Abelian Yang–Mills theory, although at that time (1969) asymptotic freedom was not yet recognized as a property of the strong interactions.

Starting in the early-1970s he was one of the initiators of the search for parity violating effects in atoms, and he has pioneered a great number of detailed calculations of the effect in various atoms, including the effect of the rotation of polarization of light in bismuth, which was the first parity violating atomic effect which was experimentally observed.

Books 
 "Parity Nonconservation in Atomic Phenomena" (1991)
 "CP Violation without Strangeness. Electric Dipole Moments of Particles, Atoms, and Molecules" (1997), with S.K.Lamoreaux
 "General Relativity" (2002)

See also
Akademgorodok

References

External links
 UNSW School of physics annual report 2004
 Pomeranchuk Prize Winners 2005

Soviet physicists
20th-century Russian physicists
Corresponding Members of the Russian Academy of Sciences
1937 births
Living people
Academic staff of Novosibirsk State University
Scientists from Novosibirsk